Option nationale (ON) fielded 116 candidates in the 2014 Quebec provincial election. It did not win any seats.

The party did not field candidates in Arthabaska, Blainville, D'Arcy-McGee, Jacques-Cartier, Jeanne-Mance–Viger, Mont-Royal, Notre-Dame-de-Grâce, Pontiac, or Westmount–Saint-Louis. Most of these ridings are bastions of Canadian federalism. Option nationale is a Quebec separatist party.

Source:

References

2014